A Twenty20 International (T20I) is a form of cricket, played between two of the international members of the International Cricket Council (ICC), in which each team faces a maximum of twenty overs. The matches have top-class status and are the highest T20 standard. The game is played under the rules of Twenty20 cricket. The first Twenty20 International match between two men's sides was played on 17 February 2005, involving Australia and New Zealand. Wisden Cricketers' Almanack reported that "neither side took the game especially seriously", and it was noted by ESPNcricinfo that but for a large score for Ricky Ponting, "the concept would have shuddered". However, Ponting himself said "if it does become an international game then I'm sure the novelty won't be there all the time".
This is a list of West Indies Cricket team's Twenty20 International records. It is based on the List of Twenty20 International records, but concentrates solely on records dealing with the West Indian cricket team. West Indies played the first ever T20I in 2006.

Key
The top five records are listed for each category, except for the team wins, losses, draws and ties, all round records and the partnership records. Tied records for fifth place are also included. Explanations of the general symbols and cricketing terms used in the list are given below. Specific details are provided in each category where appropriate. All records include matches played for West Indies only, and are correct .

Team records

Overall Record

Team wins, losses, draws and ties 
, West Indies has played 176 T20I matches resulting in 71 victories, 92 defeats, 3 ties and 10 no results for an overall winning percentage of 45.60.

First bilateral T20I series wins

First T20I match wins

Team scoring records

Most runs in an innings
The highest innings total scored in T20Is has been scored twice. The first occasion came in the match between Afghanistan and Ireland when Afghanistan scored 278/3 in the 2nd T20I of the Ireland series in India in February 2019. The Czech Republic national cricket team against Turkey during the 2019 Continental Cup scored 278/4 to equal the record. The highest score for West Indies is 245/6 scored against India in the first T20I of the August 2016 series at Central Broward Regional Park, Lauderhill.

Fewest runs in an innings
The lowest innings total scored was by Turkey against Czech Republic when they were dismissed for 21 during the 2019 Continental Cup. The lowest score in T20I history for West Indies is 45 when they were dismissed by England during the England's tour of West Indies in 2019 at the Warner Park, Basseterre, Saint Kitts and Nevis.

Most runs conceded an innings
The first T20I of the August 2016 series saw West Indies concede their highest innings total of 244/4 at Central Broward Regional Park, Lauderhill.

Fewest runs conceded in an innings
The lowest score conceded by West Indies for a full inning is 68 when they dismissed Ireland during the 2010 ICC World Twenty20 at Providence Stadium, Providence, Guyana.

Most runs aggregate in a match
The highest match aggregate scored in T20Is came in the match between India and West Indies in the first T20I of the August 2016 series at Central Broward Regional Park, Lauderhill when India scored 244/4 in response to West Indies score of 245/6 to loose the match by 1 run.

Fewest runs aggregate in a match
The lowest match aggregate in T20Is is 57 when Turkey were dismissed for 28 by Luxembourg in the second T20I of the 2019 Continental Cup in Romania in August 2019. The lowest match aggregate in T20I history for West Indies is 118 scored during the first T20I of West Indies tour of South Africa in 2007-08.

Result records
A T20I match is won when one side has scored more runs than the runs scored by the opposing side during their innings. If both sides have completed both their allocated innings and the side that fielded last has the higher aggregate of runs, it is known as a win by runs. This indicates the number of runs that they had scored more than the opposing side. If the side batting last wins the match, it is known as a win by wickets, indicating the number of wickets that were still to fall.

Greatest win margins (by runs)
The greatest winning margin by runs in T20Is was Czech Republic's victory over Turkey by 257 runs in the sixth match of the 2019 Continental Cup. The largest victory recorded by West Indies was during the 2014 ICC World Twenty20 by 84 runs against Pakistan.

Greatest win margins (by balls remaining)
The greatest winning margin by balls remaining in T20Is was Austria's victory over Turkey by 104 balls remaining in the ninth match of the 2019 Continental Cup. The largest victory recorded by West Indies is during the West Indies tour of Bangladesh in 2018 when they won by 8 wickets with 55 balls remaining.

Greatest win margins (by wickets)
A total of 22 matches have ended with chasing team winning by 10 wickets with New Zealand winning by such margins a record three times. West Indies have won by 9 wickets on two occasions.

Highest successful run chases
Australia holds the record for the highest successful run chase which they achieved when they scored 245/5 in response to New Zealand's 243/6. The highest successful chase for West Indies is 236/6 during the second match of the T20I Series against South Africa in 2015.

Narrowest win margins (by runs)
The narrowest run margin victory is by 1 run which has been achieved in 15 T20I's with West Indies winning by such margin once.

Narrowest win margins (by balls remaining)
The narrowest winning margin by balls remaining in T20Is is by winning of the last ball which has been achieved 26 times. The narrowest victory achieved by the West Indies is victory with one ball remaining on one occasion.

Narrowest win margins (by wickets)
The narrowest margin of victory by wickets is 1 wicket which has settled four such T20Is. The narrowest victory by wickets for West Indies is three wickets.

Greatest loss margins (by runs)
West Indies's biggest defeat by runs was against Pakistan in the West Indies tour of Pakistan in April 2018 by 143 runs at National Stadium, Karachi, Pakistan.

Greatest loss margins (by balls remaining)
The largest defeat suffered by West Indies was during the England's tour of West Indies in 2019 when they lost by 8 wickets with 57 balls remaining.

Greatest loss margins (by wickets)
West Indies have lost an T20I match by a margin of 10 wickets on one occasion.

Narrowest loss margins (by runs)
The narrowest loss of West Indies in terms of runs is by 1 run suffered once.

Narrowest loss margins (by balls remaining)
West Indies has suffered loss off the last ball two times.

Narrowest loss margins (by wickets)
West Indies has suffered defeat by 2 wickets once.

Tied matches 
A tie can occur when the scores of both teams are equal at the conclusion of play, provided that the side batting last has completed their innings. 
There have been 19 ties in T20Is history with West Indies involved in three such games.

Individual records

Batting records

Most career runs
A run is the basic means of scoring in cricket.
India's Virat Kohli has scored the most runs in T20Is with 3,159. Second is Martin Guptill of New Zealand with 2,939 ahead of Rohit Sharma from India in third with 2,864. Eoin Morgan is the leading English batsmen on this list.

Most runs in each batting position

Highest individual score
The third T20I of the 2018 Zimbabwe Tri-Nation Series saw Aaron Finch score the highest Individual score. Evin Lewis holds the highest such score for a West Indian batsmen.

Highest individual score – progression of record

Highest score against each opponent

Highest career average
A batsman's batting average is the total number of runs they have scored divided by the number of times they have been dismissed.

Highest Average in each batting position

Most half-centuries
A half-century is a score of between 50 and 99 runs. Statistically, once a batsman's score reaches 100, it is no longer considered a half-century but a century.

Virat Kohli of India has scored the most half-centuries in T20Is with 29. He is followed by India's Rohit Sharma on 22, Ireland's Paul Stirling on 18 and Australia's David Warner on 18. Gayle has the most half-centuries among West Indian batsmen.

Most centuries
A century is a score of 100 or more runs in a single innings.

Rohit Sharma has scored the most centuries in T20Is with 4. Gayle and Lewis, with two such knocks, hold the West Indian record.

Most Sixes

Most Fours

Highest strike rates
Ravija Sandaruwan of Kuwait holds the record for the highest strike rate, with minimum of 250 balls faced qualification, with 165.80. Andre Russell is the West Indian with the highest strike rate.

Highest strike rates in an inning
Dwayne Smith of West Indies strike rate of 414.28 during his 29 off 7 balls against Bangladesh during 2007 ICC World Twenty20 is the world record for highest strike rate in an innings.

Most runs in a calendar year
Paul Stirling of Ireland holds the record for most runs scored in a calendar year with 748 runs scored in 2019. Gayle scored 368 runs in 2012, the most for a West Indies batsmen in a year.

Most runs in a series
The 2014 ICC World Twenty20 in Bangladesh saw Virat Kohli set the record for the most runs scored in a single series scoring 319 runs. He is followed by Tillakaratne Dilshan with 317 runs scored in the 2009 ICC World Twenty20. Marlon Samuels with 230 runs in the 2012 ICC World Twenty20 holds the West Indian record.

Most ducks
A duck refers to a batsman being dismissed without scoring a run. 
Tillakaratne Dilshan of Sri Lanka, Pakistan's Umar Akmal and Ireland's Kevin O'Brien has scored the equal highest number of ducks in T20Is with 10 such knocks. Andre Russell have seven ducks, the most among West Indies batsmen.

Bowling records

Most career wickets 
A bowler takes the wicket of a batsman when the form of dismissal is bowled, caught, leg before wicket, stumped or hit wicket. If the batsman is dismissed by run out, obstructing the field, handling the ball, hitting the ball twice or timed out the bowler does not receive credit.

Lasith Malinga, former captain of Sri Lanka, is the highest wicket-taker in T20Is. Dwayne Bravo has the highest wickets among West Indies bowlers.

Best figures in an innings 
Bowling figures refers to the number of the wickets a bowler has taken and the number of runs conceded.
India's Deepak Chahar holds the world record for best figures in an innings when he took 6/7 against Bangladesh in November 2019 at Nagpur. Obed McCoy holds the West Indian record for best bowling figures.

Best figures in an innings – progression of record

Best Bowling Figure against each opponent 
{| class="wikitable sortable" 
|- 
! Opposition !! Player !! Figures !! Date
|-
| rowspan=2| || Sunil Narine ||rowspan=2|3/11 ||rowspan=2|
|-
| Kesrick Williams
|-
|  || Obed McCoy ||4/26 || 
|-
|  || Keemo Paul ||5/15 || 
|-
|  || Jason Holder ||5/27 || 
|-
| ICC World XI || Kesrick Williams ||3/42 || 
|-
|  || Obed McCoy ||6/17 || 
|-
|  || Kieron Pollard ||4/25 || 
|-
|  || Sunil Narine ||4/12 || 
|-
|  || Devendra Bishoo ||4/17 || 
|-
|  || Jason Holder || 2/14 || 
|-
|  || Dwayne Bravo || 4/19 || 
|-
|  || Oshane Thomas ||5/28 || 
|-
|  || Darren Sammy ||5/26 || 
|-
|- class=sortbottom
| colspan=5 | <small>Last updated: 17 October 2022.</small>
|}

 Best career average 
A bowler's bowling average is the total number of runs they have conceded divided by the number of wickets they have taken.
Afghanistan's Rashid Khan holds the record for the best career average in T20Is with 12.62. Ajantha Mendis, Sri Lankan cricketer, is second behind Rashid with an overall career average of 14.42 runs per wicket. Kesrick Williams has the best average among West Indies bowlers.

 Best career economy rate 
A bowler's economy rate is the total number of runs they have conceded divided by the number of overs they have bowled.
New Zealand's Daniel Vettori, holds the T20I record for the best career economy rate with 5.70. Sunil Narine, with a rate of 6.02 runs per over conceded over his 51-match T20I career, is the highest West Indian on the list.

 Best career strike rate 
A bowler's strike rate is the total number of balls they have bowled divided by the number of wickets they have taken.
The top bowler with the best T20I career strike rate is Rashid Khan of Afghanistan with 12.3 balls per wicket strike rate. Williams is the West Indian bowler with the lowest strike rate.

 Most four-wickets (& over) hauls in an innings 
Pakistan's Umar Gul has taken the most four-wickets (or over) among all the bowlers. Bravo and Darren Sammy have taken the most such hauls among West Indian bowlers.

 Best economy rates in an inning 
The best economy rate in an inning, when a minimum of 12 balls are delivered by the bowler, is Sri Lankan player Nuwan Kulasekara economy of 0.00 during his spell of 0 runs for 1 wicket in 2 overs against Netherlands at Zohur Ahmed Chowdhury Stadium in the 2014 ICC World Twenty20. Samuel Badree holds the record for West Indies bowler.

 Best strike rates in an inning 
The best strike rate in an inning, when a minimum of 4 wickets are taken by the player, is by Steve Tikolo of Kenya during his spell of 4/2 in 1.2 overs against Scotland during the 2013 ICC World Twenty20 Qualifier at ICC Academy, Dubai, UAE. Oshane Thomas recorded the best strike rate for a West Indian bowler.

 Worst figures in an innings 
The worst figures in an T20I came in the Sri Lanka's tour of Australia when Kasun Rajitha of Sri Lanka had figures of 0/75 off his four overs at Adelaide Oval, Adelaide. Keemo Paul holds the corresponding record for West Indies.

 Most runs conceded in a match 
Kasun Rajitha also holds the dubious distinction of most runs conceded in an T20I during the aforementioned match. Paul holds the corresponding West Indies record.

 Most wickets in a calendar year 
Australia's Andrew Tye holds the record for most wickets taken in a year when he took 31 wickets in 2018 in 19 T20Is. Samuel Badree with 19 wickets in 2014 holds the West Indian record for most wickets in a year.

 Most wickets in a series 
2019 ICC World Twenty20 Qualifier at UAE saw records set for the most wickets taken by a bowler in a T20I series when Oman's pacer Bilal Khan tool 18 wickets during the series. Jason Holder in the T20I series against England in January 2022 took 15 wickets, the most for a West Indian bowler in a series.

Wicket-keeping records
The wicket-keeper is a specialist fielder who stands behind the stumps being guarded by the batsman on strike and is the only member of the fielding side allowed to wear gloves and leg pads.

 Most career dismissals 
A wicket-keeper can be credited with the dismissal of a batsman in two ways, caught or stumped. A fair catch is taken when the ball is caught fully within the field of play without it bouncing after the ball has touched the striker's bat or glove holding the bat, Laws 5.6.2.2 and 5.6.2.3 state that the hand or the glove holding the bat shall be regarded as the ball striking or touching the bat while a stumping occurs when the wicket-keeper puts down the wicket while the batsman is out of his ground and not attempting a run.
Denesh Ramdin is the highest ranked West Indian wicket keeper in the all-time list of taking most dismissals in T20Is as a designated wicket-keeper just behind India's MS Dhoni.

 Most career catches 
Ramdin has taken the most catches in T20Is as a designated West Indies wicket-keeper just behind Dhoni on the all-time list.

 Most career stumpings 
Ramdin has made the most stumpings in T20Is as a designated wicket-keeper among West Indian wicket-keepers with Dhoni and Kamran Akmal of Pakistan heading this all-time list.

 Most dismissals in an innings 
Four wicket-keepers on four occasions have taken five dismissals in a single innings in an T20I.

The feat of taking 4 dismissals in an innings has been achieved by 19 wicket-keepers on 26 occasions with Denesh Ramdin doing it twice.

 Most dismissals in a series 
Netherlands wicket-keeper Scott Edwards holds the T20Is record for the most dismissals taken by a wicket-keeper in a series. He made 13 dismissals during the 2019 ICC World Twenty20 Qualifier. West Indian record is held by Denesh Ramdin when he made 6 dismissals during the 2009 ICC World Twenty20, 2012 ICC World Twenty20 and 2014 ICC World Twenty20.

Fielding records

 Most career catches 
Caught is one of the nine methods a batsman can be dismissed in cricket. The majority of catches are caught in the slips, located behind the batsman, next to the wicket-keeper, on the off side of the field. Most slip fielders are top order batsmen.

South Africa's David Miller holds the record for the most catches in T20Is by a non-wicket-keeper with 57, followed by Shoaib Malik of Pakistan on 50 and New Zealand's Martin Guptill with 47. Bravo and Kieron Pollard are the leading catcher for West Indies.

 Most catches in an innings 
The feat of taking 4 catches in an innings has been achieved by 14 fielders on 14 occasions with Sammy being the only West Indian fielder.

 Most catches in a series 
The 2019 ICC Men's T20 World Cup Qualifier, which saw Netherlands retain their title, saw the record set for the most catches taken by a non-wicket-keeper in an T20I series. Jersey's Ben Stevens and Namibia's JJ Smit took 10 catches in the series. Bravo with 7 catches in the 2014 ICC World Twenty20 is the leading West Indian fielder on this list.

Other records
 Most career matches 
Pakistan's Shoaib Malik holds the record for the most T20I matches played with 116 matches, Pollard is the most experienced West Indian player having represented the team on 93 occasions.

 Most consecutive career matches 
Afghanistan's Mohammad Shahzad and Asghar Afghan hold the record for the most consecutive T20I matches played with 58. Sammy holds the West Indian record.

 Most matches as captain 
MS Dhoni, who led the Indian cricket team from 2007 to 2016, holds the record for the most matches played as captain in T20Is with 72. Sammy has led West Indies in 47 matches, the most for any player from his country.

 Most matches won as a captain 

 Youngest players on Debut 
The youngest player to play in a T20I match is Marian Gherasim at the age of 14 years and 16 days. Making his debut for Romania against the Bulgaria on 16 October 2020 in the first T20I of the 2020 Balkan Cup thus becoming the youngest to play in a men's T20I match.

 Oldest Players on Debut 
The Turkish batsmen Osman Göker is the oldest player to make their debut a T20I match. Playing in the 2019 Continental Cup against Romania at Moara Vlasiei Cricket Ground, Moara Vlăsiei he was aged 59 years and 181 days.

 Oldest Players 
The Turkish batsmen Osman Göker is the oldest player to appear in a T20I match during the same above mentioned match.

Partnership records
In cricket, two batsmen are always present at the crease batting together in a partnership. This partnership will continue until one of them is dismissed, retires or the innings comes to a close.

Highest partnerships by wicket
A wicket partnership describes the number of runs scored before each wicket falls. The first wicket partnership is between the opening batsmen and continues until the first wicket falls. The second wicket partnership then commences between the not out batsman and the number three batsman. This partnership continues until the second wicket falls. The third wicket partnership then commences between the not out batsman and the new batsman. This continues down to the tenth wicket partnership. When the tenth wicket has fallen, there is no batsman left to partner so the innings is closed.

Highest partnerships by runs
The highest T20I partnership by runs for any wicket is held by the Afghan pairing of Hazratullah Zazai and Usman Ghani who put together an opening wicket partnership of 236 runs during the Ireland v Afghanistan series in India in 2019

Highest overall partnership runs by a pair

Umpiring records
Most matches umpired
An umpire in cricket is a person who officiates the match according to the Laws of Cricket''. Two umpires adjudicate the match on the field, whilst a third umpire has access to video replays, and a fourth umpire looks after the match balls and other duties. The records below are only for on-field umpires.

Aleem Dar of Pakistan holds the record for the most T20I matches umpired with 53. The most experienced West Indian umpire is Gregory Brathwaite with 31 matches officiated so far.

See also

List of Twenty20 International records
List of Test cricket records
List of Cricket World Cup records

Notes

References

West Indian cricket lists
West Indies in international cricket